Hillingdon Council in London, England is elected every four years. Since the 2002 boundary changes the council is composed of 65 councillors.

Political control
The first election to the council was held in 1964, initially operating as a shadow authority before the new system came into full effect in 1965. Political control of the council since 1964 has been held by the following parties:

Leadership
The leaders of the council since 1965 have been:

Council elections
 1964 Hillingdon London Borough Council election
 1968 Hillingdon London Borough Council election
 1971 Hillingdon London Borough Council election
 1974 Hillingdon London Borough Council election
 1978 Hillingdon London Borough Council election (boundary changes increased the number of seats by nine)
 1982 Hillingdon London Borough Council election
 1986 Hillingdon London Borough Council election
 1990 Hillingdon London Borough Council election
 1994 Hillingdon London Borough Council election (boundary changes took place but the number of seats remained the same)
 1998 Hillingdon London Borough Council election
 2002 Hillingdon London Borough Council election (boundary changes reduced the number of seats by four) 
 2006 Hillingdon London Borough Council election
 2010 Hillingdon London Borough Council election
 2014 Hillingdon London Borough Council election
 2018 Hillingdon London Borough Council election
 2022 Hillingdon London Borough Council election

Borough result maps

By-election results

1964-1968
There were no by-elections.

1968-1971

1971-1974

1974-1978

1978-1982

1982-1986
There were no by-elections.

1986-1990

1990-1994

The by-election was called following the resignation of Cllr. Graham E. Sewell.

The by-election was called following the resignation of Cllr. John Walker.

The by-election was called following the death of Cllr. Gordon Mcl. Bogan.

The by-election was called following the death of Cllr. Derek J. Tow.

The by-election was called following the death of Cllr. Kenneth R. Abel.

1994-1998

The by-election was called following the death of Cllr. Christopher J. Mullen.

The by-election was called following the resignation of Cllr. Gulab S. Sharma. 

The by-election was called following the death of Cllr. Philip Kordun.

1998-2002

The by-election was called following the disqualification of Cllr. Mark J. Chester.

The by-election was called following the resignation of Cllr. Timothy J. Freeman.

2002-2006

The by-election was called following the resignation of Cllr. Jagjit S. Sidhu.

The by-election was called following the death of Cllr. James J. O'Neill

The by-election was called following the death of Cllr. Margaret A. Grant.

2006-2010

The by-election was called following the death of Cllr. Norman H. Nunn-Price.

The by-election was called following the death of Cllr. Solveig Stone.

The by-election was called following the disqualification of Cllr. D Ian Oakley.

2010-2014

By-election triggered by resignation of Conservative councillor Pat Jackson.

References

Hillingdon election results
By-election results

External links
Hillingdon Council